Samsung Economic Research Institute (SERI) is a private-sector think tanks in South Korea, covering diverse areas that range from the nation's high-tech front to research on issues and trends shaping East Asian economic and business environment.  It was established in 1986 as part of Samsung Life Insurance.

History
 Jul. 1986 Established as an affiliated center of Samsung Life
 Apr. 1991 Incorporated as Samsung Economic Research Institute
 Oct. 1993 "SERI Club"a membership-based information service started
 Oct. 1996 Opened Internet homepage www.seri-samsung.org 
 Nov. 2004 Opened SERIWorld.org, an English website for a global audience
 Mar. 2006 Samsung Economy Research Institute Beijing Office (SERIChina)'s official website www.SERIChina.org opened 
 Jun. 2010 Opened a mobile website <m.seri.org>, the first for Korean private think tank

Organization
 President : Lim Dong-Sung
 President : Jung Ku-Hyun
 President : Chung Ki-Young
 SERICeo Committee :  No JaeBum
 SERIWorld Committee :  Han Jooyeon
 SERIChina : Park KiSoon 
 Senior vice president and director of Economic Policy Department : Min Seung-Kyu
 Vice president and director of Global Studies Department : Hwang In-Seong
 Senior vice president and director of human resources & Organization Research Department : Chung Kweon-Taek
 Vice president and director of Financial Industry and Strategy Department : Kwon Soon-Woo
 Senior vice president and director of Industry and Strategy Department I : Kim Jae-Yun
 Vice president and director of Industry and Strategy Department II : Kim Eun-Hwan
 Senior vice president and director of Planning & Coordination Department : Lyu Han-Ho, Lee Bum-Il
 Vice president and director of Corporate Citizenship Research Department : Shin Hyeon-Am

Research areas
 Management strategy research
 Research coordination
 Knowledge management office
 Public policy research
 Technology & industry research
 Human resources research
 Macroeconomics research
 Global studies

References

External links
Official SERI Website

Economic Research Institute
Think tanks based in South Korea